Stefan Tripković (born 19 September 1994) is a Serbian football midfielder who plays for Mačva 1929 Bogatić.

References

External links
 Stefan Tripković at Srbijafudbal
 Stefan Tripković at Utakmica.rs
 
 

1994 births
Living people
Sportspeople from Loznica
Association football midfielders
Serbian footballers
Serbian expatriate footballers
FK BASK players
FK Banat Zrenjanin players
FK Palić players
FK Rad players
FK Voždovac players
FK BSK Borča players
FK Zvijezda 09 players
FK Loznica players
FK Mačva Šabac players
Serbian First League players
Serbian SuperLiga players
Premier League of Bosnia and Herzegovina players
Serbian expatriate sportspeople in Bosnia and Herzegovina
Expatriate footballers in Bosnia and Herzegovina